The 1955 Boston Red Sox season was the 55th season of franchise of Major League Baseball history. The Red Sox finished 4th in the American League (AL) with a record of 84 wins and 70 losses, 12 games behind the New York Yankees.

Offseason 
 October 14, 1954: Owen Friend was purchased by the Red Sox from the Cleveland Indians.

Regular season 
After finishing fourth — but 42 games behind the pennant-winning Cleveland Indians — in 1954, the 1955 Red Sox improved substantially, gaining 15 games in the win column (although again finishing fourth). The Red Sox played especially well throughout the early and middle parts of the season, seemingly in pennant contention for the first time since 1950. Much of the improvement was ascribed to rookie manager Pinky Higgins, promoted to Boston after eight years as a skipper in the team's farm system.

But the Red Sox' improvement on the field was overshadowed by the sudden illness and death, on June 27, of the team's sophomore first baseman, Harry Agganis. Perhaps the most celebrated Boston-area athlete of the 20th century, the Lynn, Massachusetts, native had starred in football as the quarterback of the Boston University Terriers before signing a professional baseball contract with the Red Sox. He was batting .313 in 83 at bats on June 2 when he was initially taken ill with pneumonia. He died less than four weeks later, at 26, of a massive pulmonary embolism.

Season standings

Record vs. opponents

Opening Day lineup

Notable transactions 
 June 12, 1955: Owen Friend was purchased from the Red Sox by the Chicago Cubs.

Roster

Player stats

Batting

Starters by position 
Note: Pos = Position; G = Games played; AB = At bats; H = Hits; Avg. = Batting average; HR = Home runs; RBI = Runs batted in

Other batters 
Note: G = Games played; AB = At bats; H = Hits; Avg. = Batting average; HR = Home runs; RBI = Runs batted in

Pitching

Starting pitchers 
Note: G = Games pitched; IP = Innings pitched; W = Wins; L = Losses; ERA = Earned run average; SO = Strikeouts

Other pitchers 
Note: G = Games pitched; IP = Innings pitched; W = Wins; L = Losses; ERA = Earned run average; SO = Strikeouts

Relief pitchers 
Note: G = Games pitched; W = Wins; L = Losses; SV = Saves; ERA = Earned run average; SO = Strikeouts

Farm system

References

External links
1955 Boston Red Sox team page at Baseball Reference
1955 Boston Red Sox season at baseball-almanac.com

Boston Red Sox seasons
Boston Red Sox
Boston Red Sox
1950s in Boston